Stripe Mountain is the highest point in both the South Clearwater Mountains and the Clearwater Mountains as a whole, part of the Bitterroot Range and Rocky Mountains in the panhandle of Idaho in the Western United States. The Idaho County portion of the mountain lies within the Bitterroot National Forest and the Lemhi County portion of the mountain lies within the Salmon-Challis National Forest, and the entirety of the mountain lies within the Frank Church-River of No Return Wilderness Area.

References 

Mountains of Idaho County, Idaho
Mountains of Lemhi County, Idaho
Mountains of Idaho